Maloisimovo (Kese İsem) is a rural locality (a village) in Isimovsky Selsoviet, Kugarchinsky District, Bashkortostan, Russia. The population was 30 as of 2010. There is 1 street.

Geography 
Maloisimovo is located 24 km southwest of Mrakovo (the district's administrative centre) by road. Salikhovo is the nearest rural locality.

References 

Rural localities in Kugarchinsky District